Santiago Giraldo was the defending champion, but decided not to participate this year.
John Millman defeated 5th seed Robert Kendrick 6–3, 6–2 in the final match.

Seeds

Draw

Finals

Top half

Bottom half

References
 Main Draw
 Qualifying Draw

Natomas Men's Professional Tennis Tournament - Singles
2010 Singles